Let's Dance – Kids is a German children's dance competition television series that premiered on April 9, 2021, on the premium sector TVNOW and on the television channel RTL, which premiered on May 16, 2021. It is a spin-off of the Let's Dance series and based on the American version Dancing with the Stars: Juniors. The format of the show features celebrity children (either in their own right or having celebrity parentage) paired with professional junior ballroom dancers and mentored by an adult professional dancer. The couples compete against each other by performing choreographed dance routines in front of a panel of judges.

The first Dancing Sternchen was Jona Szewczenko & Tizio Tiago Domingues da Silva and with Roberto Albanese as the coach.

Cast

Hosts and judges
The show was originally presented from current hosts of Let’s Dance Daniel Hartwich and Victoria Swarovski and also the three judges were from the current season of Let’s Dance Joachim Llambi, Motsi Mabuse and Jorge González.

Couples and mentors
In April 2021, TVNOW and RTL announced the five celebrity kids, the professional partners and the coaches.

Scoring chart

Red numbers indicates the lowest score for each week.
Green numbers indicates the highest score for each week.
 indicates the couple eliminated that week.
 indicates the returning couple that finished in the bottom two.
 indicates the winning couple.
 indicates the runner-up couple.

Averages 
This table only counts for dances scored on a traditional 30-points scale.

Highest and lowest scoring performances 
The best and worst performances in each dance according to the judges' marks are as follows:

Couples' highest and lowest scoring dances
According to the traditional 30-point scale.

Weekly scores and songs

Week 1: Summer Party
Original airdate:
TVNOW: 
RTL: 

Running order

Week 2: Movie Night
Original airdate:
TVNOW: 
RTL: 

Running order

Week 3: Time travel
Original airdate:
TVNOW: 
RTL: 

Running order

Week 4: Finale
Original airdate:
TVNOW: 
RTL: 

Running order

Dance chart
 Highest scoring dance
 Lowest scoring dance

References

External links
Official website

Let's Dance (German TV series)
German music television series
German reality television series
2021 German television series debuts
2020s German television series
2021 German television seasons
German television spin-offs
Reality television spin-offs
German-language television shows
RTL (German TV channel) original programming
German television series based on American television series
Television series about children